Omicron Kappa Upsilon is a national honorary society serving the field of dentistry.

History
The Society originated with the 1914 graduating class of the dental school at Northwestern University in Chicago. The idea for the fraternity came from the Dean of the Northwestern University Dental School, Dr. Green Vardiman Black, "G.V. Black", who soon invited the deans of 51 other dental school extant at the time to organize chapters of their own, forming a network of locals. It quickly expanded, with its Alpha through Kappa chapters considered to be "founding chapters."

Omicron Kappa Upsilon's first Canadian chapter was Tau Tau, at the University of Toronto, followed by chapters at the University of Manitoba, University of British Columbia, and the University of Western Ontario. Of these, only the Toronto unit remains active.

The Society has expanded to serve most US and Canadian dental schools, with few exceptions. Several dental schools have shuttered over the years, resulting in the cessation of active chapters on those campuses. The Society's Alpha chapter at Northwestern closed in 2001 when that school's dental program ceased. The Society has 63 active chapters as of 2022.

Membership
Membership is conferred in a two-step process, first by the student's attainment within the top 20% of a school's graduating class, then by a faculty vote based on qualities including character, service, research, etc. Thus only the top 12% of students are selected. The Society also offers faculty and honorary membership categories.

Symbols and traditions
Lilac is the traditional symbol of Dentistry. It features prominently on graduation stoles for students and faculty within the field, and is used as the primary color for  materials and publications. The official colors of the society are Navy blue and gold, using Lilac trim.

Chapters
Chapters of Omicron Kappa Upsilon include the following.  Active chapters noted in bold, inactive chapters noted in italics.

References

See also
 Delta Sigma Delta
 Xi Psi Phi
 Psi Omega
 Alpha Omega
 Sigma Phi Alpha
 List of dental schools in the United States
 List of defunct dental schools in the United States

Dental organizations based in the United States
Honor societies
Student organizations established in 1914
1914 establishments in Illinois